The Langenberg, also colloquially called the Langenberge (plural) due to its several and widely spaced hilltops, is a hill range of the German Central Uplands which covers an area of over 22 km² and reaches a height of  at the Schwengeberg. It is a natural region in the Habichtswald Highlands in the counties of Kassel and Schwalm-Eder-Kreis in North Hesse.

The actual Langenberg itself is the hill chain that runs from the Saukopf south-southeast via the Schwengeberg, Laufskopf, Bensberg and Bilstein to the  Kammerberg and forms the eastern watershed of the Eder tributary, the Ems at Bauna and the stream of Pilgerbach. In the eponymous natural region this crest line is flanked by woodland to the west and east, and in the southeast by the adjacent higher ground west of the Kassel Basin.

Geography

Location 
The Langenberg lies in the south of the Habichtswald Highlands. Its northern part is located in the county of Kassel and its southern part, the Gudensberg Forest  (Gudensberger Wald), in the county of Schwalm-Eder-Kreis. In the Habichtswald Nature Park both parts extend west to southwest into the borough of Baunatal.

Northeast of the Langenberge, on the far side of the Hoofer Pforte and Schauenburg castle ruins (499.9 m) and the adjoining valley of the Bauna to the east, is the High Habichtswald (Hoher Habichtswald). Towards the east the land descends over the borough of Baunatal and along the lower courses of the Bauna to the River Fulda. To the southeast and south the terrain of the Langenberge descends via Gudensberg and Edermünde to the valley of the Eder; towards the southwest to the valley of the Eder tributary, the Ems, while in a northwesterly direction they flow seamlessly into the hilltops of the Hinterhabichtswald Kuppen. Immediately east of them and running further to the northwest is the Habichtswald Depression, clearly separated by the kuppen of the High Habichtswald.

Natural regions 
The Langenberg forms a natural region of the same name (no. 342.02) within the major unit group, the West Hesse Highlands (No. 34), the major unit of the Habichtswald Highlands (342) and the sub-unit of the Habichtswald (including Langenberg) (342.0).

Hills 
The highest point of the Langenberge is the Schwengeberg at 556.7 m.

The following list shows the kuppen (rounded hilltops) of the Langenberg and the Hoofer Pforte to the north along the main watershed, in order from north to south, with their heights in metres (m) above Normalhöhennull (NHN; according to ) unless otherwise stated; branches to the east (E) and west (W) are indented; hills outside the Habichtswald Nature Park are asterisked (*):
 Hoofer Pforte
 Lindenberg (485.9 m)
 Großer Schönberg (482.8 m)
 Kleiner Schönberg (ca. 442 m)
 Burgberg (Schauenburg) (499.9 m), near Schauenburg-Hoof, county of Kassel, with remains of Schauenburg castle
 Langenberg/e
 Saukopf (511.4 m), between Schauenburg-Breitenbach, -Elmshagen and -Hoof, Kassel
 Essigberg (ca. 470 m), near Schauenburg-Elmshagen, Kassel
 Schwengeberg (556.7 m), Schwalm-Eder-Kreis, near Niedenstein-Ermetheis
 (O) Burgberg (Baunatal) (439.6 m), near Baunatal-Großenritte, Kassel; with ringwall
 Laufskopf (534.8 m), Schwalm-Eder-Kreis, near Niedenstein-Ermetheis
 Bensberg (464.8 m), bei Edermünde-Besse, Schwalm-Eder-Kreis
 Bilstein (ca. 460 m), near Edermünde-Besse, Schwalm-Eder-Kreis, with Ringwall
 Kammerberg (360.8 m), near Niedenstein-Metze, Schwalm-Eder-Kreis
 (W) Junkerskopf * (284.2 m), bei Niedenstein-Metze, Schwalm-Eder-Kreis
 Großer Wachenkopf * (333.1 m), near Niedenstein-Metze, Schwalm-Eder-Kreis
 Kleiner Wachenkopf * (ca. 327 m), near Niedenstein-Metze, Schwalm-Eder-Kreis

Rivers and streams 
Among the rivers and streams of the Langenberge are the:
 Bauna, tributary of the Fulda
 Ems (touches the Langenberge in the northwest), tributary of the Eder
 Goldbach, tributary of the Ems
 Leisel, tributary of the Bauna
 Lützel, tributary of the Bauna
 Matzoff, tributary of the Ems
 Pilgerbach, tributary of the Eder
 Wiehoff, tributary of the Ems

Settlements 
Villages in the area of the Langenberge are: 
 Schauenburg, Kassel 
 Niedenstein, Schwalm-Eder-Kreis
 Baunatal, Kassel
 Edermünde, Schwalm-Eder-Kreis
 Gudensberg, Schwalm-Eder-Kreis

References 

Central Uplands
Hill ranges of Germany
Natural regions of the West Hesse Highlands